is a city located in Hyōgo Prefecture, Japan. , the city had an estimated population of 484,368 in 218,948 households and a population density of 4800 persons per km². Nishinomiya is an important commercial and shipping city in the Kansai region with the third largest population in Hyōgo Prefecture. Nishinomiya is best known as the home of Kōshien Stadium, where the Hanshin Tigers baseball team plays home games and where Japan's annual high school baseball championship is held.

Geography 
Nishinomiya is located in southeast Hyōgo Prefecture between the cities of Kobe and Osaka. It is bordered by Osaka Bay to the south, the cities of Amagasaki, Itami and Takarazuka along the Mukogawa and Nigawa rivers to the east and by a part of the  Rokkō Mountains and Kobe to the north. The city can be divided into two areas: a mountainous area in the north and a coastal plain in the south. Situated in the middle is Mount Kabuto (309 meters), a landmark of the city.

Neighboring municipalities
Hyōgo Prefecture
Kita-ku, Kobe
Amagasaki
Itami
Takarazuka
Ashiya

Climate
Nishinomiya has a Humid subtropical climate (Köppen Cfa) characterized by warm summers and cool winters with light snowfall.  The average annual temperature in Nishinomiya is 14.6 °C. The average annual rainfall is 1578 mm with September as the wettest month. The temperatures are highest on average in January, at around 26.4 °C, and lowest in January, at around 3.3 °C.

Demographics
Per Japanese census data, the population of Nishinomiya grew rapidly in the 1950s and 1960s, and has been increasing at a slower rate since.

History 
The area of Nishinomiya was part of ancient  Settsu Province and has been inhabited since ancient times, with the traces of  Yayoi period settlements, many kofun burial mounds found within the city limits. From the Asuka period, the Hirota Shrine was built, and the market town which developed around its west gate was the ancestor of "Nishinomiya". From the Muromachi period, Nishinomiya was famed for its production of sake. During the Edo Period, the area was tenryō territory under the direct administration of the Tokugawa shogunate. The town of Nishinomiya was established on April 1, 1889 with the creation of the modern municipalities system. Nishinomiya was a center of the culture from the 1910s to 1940s in which has been dubbed "Hanshinkan Modernism". This included the opening of the Kōshien Stadium opened on April 1, 1924. Nishinomiya was elevated to city status on April 1, 1925. The city expanded with the annexation of the town of Imazu and villages of Shiba and Taishi in April 1933, the village of Koto in February 1941, the village of Kawaragi in May 1942, and the villages of Naruo, Yamaguchi and Shiose in April 1951. The January 17, 1995  Great Hanshin earthquake caused widespread damage in Nishinomiya.

Government
Nishinomiya has a mayor-council form of government with a directly elected mayor and a unicameral city council of 41 members. Nishinomiya contributes seven members to the Hyōgo Prefectural Assembly. In terms of national politics, the city is divided between the Hyōgo 2nd district  and Hyōgo 7th districts of the lower house of the Diet of Japan.

Economy 
In terms of industry, food and beverages (especially sake, which is a traditional industry) are a major portion of the local economy. The city is also located on a corner of the Hanshin industrial zone.

 Furuno, a global electronics company, whose main products include marine electronics and medical equipment, has its headquarters in the city.

Agriculture 
Since most of the farmland is in the urban district, Nishinomiya agriculture is in a difficult situation; it worsens every year. Efforts are being made to improve farming to make it profitable by growing such marketable products as soft vegetables for the big markets of Osaka and Kobe. Other efforts include effective land use by growing crops in greenhouses using hydroponic techniques and development of techniques for safe products.

Residential districts 
Nishinomiya is situated between the major cities of Kobe and Osaka. Luxury neighborhoods are common in this city, especially in areas near Ashiya. Some of the shopping malls in Nishinomiya are the Lalaport Koshien and the Hankyu Nishinomiya Gardens.

Education

Universities and colleges 
Konan University Nishinomiya Campus "Konan Cube"
Kwansei Gakuin University, a private university founded by American missionaries in the nineteenth century. 
Otemae University
Kobe College (Women's university)
Seiwa College and Junior College
Hyogo College Of Medicine
Mukogawa Women's University and Junior College
Shukugawa Gakuin Junior College
Koshien Junior College

Primary and secondary schools
Nishinomiya has 40 public elementary schools and 19 public middle schools operated by the city government, and nine public high schools operated by the Hyōgo Prefectural Board of Education. There are also two private elementary schools, seven private middle schools and seven private high schools. In addition, the city also operates one. and the prefecture operates two, special education school for the handicapped.

Transportation

Railways 
 JR West - Kobe Line
  -  - 
 JR West - Fukuchiyama Line
  -  - 

 Hankyu - Hankyu Kobe Main Line
  - 
 Hankyu - Hankyu Imazu Line
  -  -  -  - 
 Hankyu - Hankyu Kōyō Line
  -  - 

 Hanshin Electric Railway - Hanshin Main Line
  -  -  -  -  - 
 Hanshin Electric Railway - Hanshin Mukogawa Line
  -  -  -

Highways 
  Meishin Expressway
   Chūgoku Expressway

Sister and friendship cities 
Sister cities
 Spokane since September 1961 (U.S., Washington)
Friendship cities
 Londrina since May 1977 (Brazil, Paraná)
 Shaoxing since July 1985 (China, Zhejiang)
 District of Lot-et-Garonne and Agen since April, 1992 (France, 
 Burlington (U.S., Vermont)
 Aquitaine
 Amami since October 1981 (Japan, Kagoshima) (formerly Naze)
 Yusuhara since March 1991 (Japan, Kōchi)

Local attractions

Hirota Shrine - Hirota Shrine was called  by aristocrats in Kyoto. That is the origin of the city name.
Hyogo Performing Arts Center
Kannō-ji
Koshikiiwa Shrine
Nishinomiya Shrine
Mondo-yakujin (Tōkō-ji)
 Kitayama Botanical Garden
 Mount Kabuto

In Popular Culture
Much of Grave of the Fireflies is set in Nishinomiya.
Nishinomiya is the setting for the popular light novel, manga, and anime series The Melancholy of Haruhi Suzumiya.

Notable people from Nishinomiya
Mana Ashida – teen actress
Aimyon – singer-songwriter
Nagaru Tanigawa – author of the light novel series Haruhi Suzumiya
Yuichiro Nagashima – kickboxer
Ryūsui Seiryōin – novelist
Kaoru Betto - baseball player
Hiro Matsushita – Businessman, former driver in Champ Car series. Chairman of Swift Engineering & Swift Xi
Hōsei Yamasaki – comedian
Eizo Sakamoto – heavy metal musician
Kaoru – lead guitarist of Dir En Grey
Yuya Matsushita – singer and actor
Mina – American-born Japanese singer based in South Korea, member of Twice (Originally from San Antonio, Texas, United States of America)
Akira Tozawa – professional wrestler
Rika Kihira – figure skater
Daisuke Inoue - inventor of the karaoke machine

Gallery

References

External links 

 
 
 Nishinomiya City official website 
 Hyogo Performing Arts Center

 
Cities in Hyōgo Prefecture
Port settlements in Japan
Populated coastal places in Japan